Yennefer, Yenifer, or Yennifer is a (usually female) given name likely derived from the Cornish name Jennifer, itself a cognate of the name Guinevere. It appears more in Spanish speaking and Latin American countries. Real and fictional people with the name include:

Yennefer
Yennefer of Vengerberg, a female character from The Witcher universe

Yenifer
Yenifer Ramos (born 1999, Yennifer Ramos López), female Cuban footballer
Yenifer Giménez (born 1996, Yenifer Yuliet Giménez Gamboa), female Venezuelan footballer
Jennifer Padilla (born 1990, Jennifer Padilla González), female Colombian track and field athlete

Yennifer
Yennifer Toledo (born 2000, Yennifer Amanda Toledo Abreu), female Cuban handball player
Jennifer Cesar (born 1989, Jennifer Mariana Cesar Salazar), female Venezuelan road cyclist
Frank Casañas (born 1978, Yennifer Frank Casañas Hernández), male Spanish discus thrower who competed for Cuba and Spain

See also
Jennifer (disambiguation)
Park Ye-eun (born 1989, also known as Yenny), female South Korean singer